Helge Andreas Norbakken (born 1965) is a Norwegian drummer  known for his collaborations with Mari Boine, Jon Balke (MNO/Bathagraf/Siwan), Kari Bremnes, Maria Joao, Karl Seglem, Becaye Aw, Miki N'Doye, Jovan Pavlovic, and Anne Wylie. He is married to Dagrun Hjelleset Norbakken.

Career 
Norbakken is a graduate of the Jazz program at Trondheim Musikkonservatorium (1985–88), and is one of the most renowned Scandinavian percussionists. He started going on international venues within Mari Boine Band, and recorded Goaskjinvellja, Lehakastin, Ballvvoslatina, and live Eallin (1997) with her, then continued with Maria Joao, Jon Balke, Kari Brenmes, Ayub Ogada and an impressive list of Norwegian and international musicians.
 
After working with arvmusic on Mari Boine's tours, he recorded and played live with Ayub Ogada (in trio with Giovanni Amighetti and with a full big band including sound engineer Geir Ostensio, Gjermund Silset, Giovanni Amighetti and Roger Ludvigsen), Vladimir Denissenkov, Tiziana Ghiglioni in "La voce del Mondo" and Guo Yue with Shan Qi. Norbakken developed a very original percussions style, based on sound research, hand-made instruments and original timbres merge.
Everything go into strict multirythmical patterns those remember at the same moment Steve Reich, Philip Glass and Doudou N'Dyae Rose works...
In studio he is a master in creating particular structures using (many) tracks and percussions over recordings.

Discography (in selection) 
With Frode Alnæs
2012: Envy The Man (Big Box Music)

With Jon Balke
2004: Diverted Travels (ECM), within Magnetic North Orchestra
2005: Statements (ECM), within Batagraf
2009: Siwan (ECM), within Siwan
2011: Say And Play (ECM), within Batagraf

With Mari Boine
1993: Goaskinviellja – Ørnebror – Eagle brother (Lean)
1994: Leahkastin (Lean, Verve World)
1996: Radiant Warmth (Antilles)
1997: Eallin – Live (Antilles)
1998: Balvoslatnja – Room of Worship (Antilles)
2001: Winter in Moscow (Jaro Medien GmbH) feat. Inna Zhelannaya & Sergey Starostin

With Kari Bremnes
1998: Svarta Bjørn (Kirkelig Kulturverksted)
2001: Desemberbarn (Kirkelig Kulturverksted)
2005: Over en by (Reise) (Kirkelig Kulturverksted)
2007: Live (Reise) (Kirkelig Kulturverksted)
2009: Ly (Kirkelig Kulturverksted)
2012: Og Så Kom Resten Av Livet (Kirkelig Kulturverksted)

With Jon Hassell
2009: Last Night the Moon Came Dropping Its Clothes in the Street (ECM)

With Maria Joao & Mario Laginha
2000: Chorrinho Feliz (Verve)
2001: Mumadji (EmArcy)
2002: Undercovers (EmArcy, Universal)
2004: Tralha (Universal Portugal)
2009: Chocolate (Decca International)
2011: Follow the Songlines (Naive) with David Linx & Diederik Wissels

With Karl Seglem
2004: Femstein (NorCD)
2007: Urbs (NorCD)

With Trondheim Jazz Orchestra and Elin Rosseland
2014: Ekko (MNJ)

With Ann Wylie
2001: One And Two (Biber)
2003: Silver Apples of the Moon (Biber)
2008: Deep Waters (Biber)

With others
1987: Vol. IV (Studentersamfundets Plateselskap), within Bodega Band
1993: Shaken But Not Stirred (Curling Legs), with Palisander Kvartetten
1994: Langt nord I livet (Kirkelig Kulturverksted), with Erik Bye
1996: Hvit Pil, with Hege Rimestad
1997: PIP, with Steinar Ofsdal
1997: Salimie, with Ayub Ogada, Giovanni Amighetti, Gjermund Silset, Roger Ludvigsen (Intuition)
1997: Kuling I Skyggen (Bare Bra Musikk), with "Reiseradioen & Solskinnsgutta" (Gisle Børge Styve)
1998: La voce del mondo, with Tiziana Ghiglioni, Giovanni Amighetti, Roger Ludvigsen, Gjermund Silset (Arvmusic/IRD)
2000: Anastasia, with Vladimir Denissenkov, Gjermund Silset (Arvmusic/IRD)
2001: Floating Rhythms, with Terje Isungset
2001: Kråkeviks songbook, with Herborg Kråkevik
2003: A Dance with the Shadows (The Wild Places), with Tirill Mohn
2006: Tuki, with Miki N'Doye
2006: Into Paradise, with Sissel Kyrkjebø
2007: Urban Jive, with Olav Torget
2008: After a day of rain, with Benedicte Torget
2008: Magma, with Jan Gunnar Hoff
2008: Det er den draumen, with Sondre Bratland
2008: Rite, with Unni Løvlid
2008: Sviv, with Steinar Ofsdal
2008: PdPMH A/R (Naïve), with Laurence Revel
2008: Lysmannen, with Geirr Lystrup
2009: Æ Ror Aleina, with Tonje Unstad
2009: Sibi, within Becaye Aw
2009: Shan Qi, Energy of the mountains (DVD by Ozella music), with Guo Yue, Giovanni Amighetti, Wu Fei, Guido Ponzini
2009: Hildring, with Hildegunn Øiseth
2009: Piper on the Roof, with Elisabeth Vatn
2010: Arctic Cinema (iBoks), within No Border Orchestra
2010: Påskemorgen Slukker Sorgen (Gateway), with Lise Petersen
2012: Jeg Har Vel Ingen Kjærere (Plush Badger), with Anne Gravir Klykken
2012: Heilt Nye Vei (Ozella), with Elin Furubotn
2012: A Distant Youth (panai), with Wu Fei

References 

1965 births
Living people
Musicians from Tromsø
Musicians from Oslo
20th-century Norwegian drummers
21st-century Norwegian drummers
Norwegian jazz drummers
Male drummers
Norwegian jazz composers
Norwegian University of Science and Technology alumni
ECM Records artists
20th-century drummers
Male jazz composers
20th-century Norwegian male musicians
21st-century Norwegian male musicians
Trondheim Jazz Orchestra members